Bernhard Knoll is a professor of International Relations who is interested in the Organization for Security and Co-operation in Europe (OSCE) and its activities, and was a member of the United Nations Interim Administration Mission in Kosovo (UNMIK).

Biography
Prior to 2006, Knoll was involved in the OSCE Mission to Bosnia and then the OSCE Mission to Kosovo from 2000 to 2002. and then with UNMIK.

In 2006 Knoll was a Special Advisor to the Director of the OSCE Office for Democratic Institutions and Human Rights (ODIHR), where he was an elections monitor in 2007.

Knoll advised Janez Lenarcic when in 2008 the latter was the incoming Director of the ODIHR.

Knoll's 2008 doctoral thesis was published by Cambridge University Press and attracted some scholarly attention.

In March 2009 Knoll found it significant that neither the SRSG nor the United Nations Security Council pronounced Kosovo's declaration of independence a violation of Resolution 1244.

Knoll was an OSCE elections monitor at the 2012 Russian Federation elections.

Knoll was in January 2013 an academic at the Central European University in Budapest, where he directed the Global Policy Academy.

Knoll was mentioned as a historian in the final report of UNMIK, as well as being cited extensively in most worthwhile papers on the subject of UNMIK.

In November and December 2020, Knoll wrote about the role of the European Union in post-war Karabakh. He wrote as well in February 2021 about a possible role for the OSCE there.

References

Bibliography
 
 
 
 Bernard Knoll and Robert-Jan Uhl, “Too Little, Too Late: the Human Rights Advisory Panel in Kosovo”, 7 European Human Rights Law Review (2007), pp. 534–549.
 
 KNOLL, Bernhard, Kosovo’s Status Process and the Prospect of Sovereignty, OSCE Yearbook, 2008, 121-160
 Knoll, Bernhard. “Kosovo: Statusprozess und Ausblick auf die staatliche Souveränität“, OSCE Core Year Book (2008).
 
 
 
 
 Jens-Hagen Eschenbächer and Bernhard Knoll, “Observing Elections in ‘Long-Standing Democracies’: Added Value or Waste of Money?”, in Institute for Peace Research and Security Policy (ed.) OSCE Yearbook 2010 (Baden-Baden: Nomos, 2011), p. 263.
 Nathalie Tagwerker, Ruben-Eric Diaz-Plaja and Bernhard Knoll, “The OSCE and the Middle East and North African Region: Not So Fast?”, in Security and Human Rights, Vol. 23, No. 3 (2012), p. 191-197.

Austrian academics
Austrian writers
Austrian legal scholars
Austrian diplomats
Academic staff of Central European University
International law scholars
Living people
Year of birth missing (living people)